Michel de Ligne, 14th Prince de Ligne, Prince d'Épinoy, Prince d'Amblise, GE (Michel Charles Eugène Marie Lamoral; born 26 May 1951) is the head of the princely House of Ligne. He is the eldest son of Antoine, 13th Prince de Ligne, and his wife, Princess Alix of Luxembourg; he is thus a nephew of the late Jean, Grand Duke of Luxembourg, and a cousin of reigning Grand Duke Henri. He is also a Knight of the Order of the Golden Fleece in Austria.

Early life
Michel was born 26 May 1951 as the first child of Belgian nobleman Prince Antoine of Ligne (youngest child of Prince Eugène, 11th Prince of Ligne and his wife Philippine de Noailles) and his wife Princess Alix of Luxembourg (youngest daughter of Charlotte, Grand Duchess of Luxembourg and her consort Prince Felix né: Prince of Bourbon-Parma).

At the time of his birth, Michel was third in line of succession to the title of Prince of Ligne; he was also the first grandchild of his maternal grandparents.

Marriage and children
On 10 March 1981 in Rio de Janeiro, Michel married Princess Eleonora of Orléans-Braganza (born 20 May 1953 in Jacarezinho), daughter of Prince Pedro Henrique of Orléans-Braganza and Princess Maria Elisabeth of Bavaria.

Arms

References

External links

 Princes of Ligne

1951 births
Living people
14
Grandees of Spain
Knights of the Golden Fleece of Austria